The Grêmio Recreativo Escola de Samba Império Serrano is a samba school of the city of Rio de Janeiro, that was created on March 23 of 1947 after a disagreement of the extinct samba school Prazer da Serrinha. It was nine times champion of the Carnaval and can be considered one of the most traditional schools of the samba of the city. One of the principal vainglories of its members is the open democracy of the school, established in the school's foundation. Its history is normally confused with the history of the Morro da Serrinha, despite its headquarters being in Avenida Ministro Edgard Romero near the Estação Mercadão de Madureira, but in the same neighborhood: Madureira.

The Ala de Compositores (Ala of the Composers) of Império is one of the most respected, having in its history people such as Silas de Oliveira, Mano Décio, Aniceto do Império, Molequinho, Dona Ivone Lara (first woman to participate in the ala of the composers of the samba schools), Beto sem Braço, Aluizio Machado, and Arlindo Cruz.

The school's history is crowned by splendid sambas, true classics of the samba-enredo such as Aquarela Brasileira ("Brazilian Aquarelle") (1964 and 2004), Exaltação a Tiradentes ("Exaltation to Tiradentes") (1949), Os Cinco Bailes da História do Rio ("The Five Balls of the History of Rio") (1965), Heróis da Liberdade ("Liberty Heroes") (1969), Bumbum paticumbum Prugurundum (1982), among others.

In 1982, the singer Clara Nunes recorded the samba Serrinha, in homage to Mauro Duarte and Paulo César Pinheiro.

In the 1990s, the school confronted serious political problems that resulted in three downgradings (1991, 1997, and 1999).

The school returned to the elite of the Carnaval in 2001, though struggling to remain in the group. That year, the school brought the samba of Arlindo Cruz, Maurição, Carlos Sena, and Elmo Caetano, and it was considered by the reviewers as the most beautiful of the year. The samba narrated the story of the Resistance, nickname of the Syndicate of the Stevedores of Rio de Janeiro, with which many of the school's members were connected.

In 2004, the Império repeated the samba-enredo Aquarela do Brasil, considered one of the most beautiful sambas-enredo in history, and despite financial problems and internal disputes, received a Sambadrome standing ovation. In 2007, the school fell again to the Grupo de Acesso, but won the title in 2017, resulting in a 2018 return to the Special Group.

Classifications

References

External links 
Official site 

Samba schools of Rio de Janeiro
1947 establishments in Brazil